Empress Dowager Wei may refer to:

Empress Dowager Wei (Later Liang) ( 401), empress dowager of the Later Liang state
Empress Wei (Tang dynasty) (died 710), consort and empress dowager of the Tang dynasty

See also
Empress Wei (disambiguation)

Wei